The European super grid is a possible future super grid that would ultimately interconnect the various European countries and the regions around Europe's borders – including North Africa, Kazakhstan, and Turkey – with a high-voltage direct current (HVDC) power grid.

It is envisaged that a European super grid would:

 lower the cost of power in all participating countries by allowing the entire region to share the most efficient power plants;
 pool load variability and power station unreliability, reducing the margin of inefficient spinning reserve and standby that have to be supplied;
 allow for wider use of renewable energy, particularly wind energy, from the concept that "it is always windy somewhere" – in particular it tends to be windy in the summer in North Africa, and windy in the winter in Europe;
 allow wide sharing of the total European hydro power resource, which is about 6 weeks of full load European output;
 decrease Europe's dependence on imported fuels.

Proposed schemes

The most comprehensive study has been carried out by Dr Gregor Czish, of Kassel University.  His study optimised a vast grid covering North Africa, Eastern Europe, Norway, and Iceland. His study ran a number of scenarios, wind, concentrating solar power (CSP), nuclear etc., and the optimisation showed that all European power could largely come from wind energy, with relatively low amounts of combustion plant needed during universal low wind periods.  Furthermore, the study showed that no new storage would be required; existing hydro would be sufficient. The total cost, including for new combustion plant, fuelled by biomass, the cost of the interconnections, the inefficiency of starting and stopping the combustion plant, all indicated a power price at the same as Germany was paying in 2005.

A number of other specific schemes have been proposed to create super grids of varying extent within Europe. These include:

 Baltic Energy Market Interconnection Plan involving Denmark, Estonia, Finland, Germany, Latvia, Lithuania, Poland, Sweden and Norway.
 Europagrid, proposed by Europagrid Limited to link various European countries including the United Kingdom, Ireland, Netherlands, Belgium, Germany and Norway.
 North Sea Offshore Grid, an active proposal by the European Commission, first proposed in November 2008 as a building block towards a Europe-wide super grid involving Germany, the United Kingdom, France, Denmark, Sweden, the Netherlands, Belgium, Ireland and Luxembourg.
 Low Grid, proposed by Greenpeace to link the countries of Central Europe, particularly Germany, the Netherlands, Belgium and France.
 High Grid, proposed by Greenpeace to link Europe and North Africa, emphasising the installation of solar power in the South of Europe.
 ISLES, an active proposal, at feasibility stage as of September 2011, to link Scotland, Northern Ireland and Ireland with off-shore renewable energy generation.
 The All Islands Approach, based on cooperation between the countries of the British Isles.
 EU PowerNet, a supergrid to be owned by a cooperative company, owned and governed by the 'national TSOs' of participating European States. The concept recognises the national sovereignty of those States while realising 'direct interconnectors' between all TSO-networks instead of only between neighbors.

Related schemes

DESERTEC, a concept based upon the idea of building concentrating solar power (CSP) stations in North Africa and the Middle East and exporting the power to Europe by HVDC lines.
Medgrid, a project planned in North Africa, which aims to promote and develop a Euro-Mediterranean electricity network that would provide North Africa & Europe with inexpensive renewable electricity, mostly solar. The goal is to install 20 GW of generating capacity, with 5 GW being devoted to exports for Europe.

On Nov 24, 2011, a memorandum of understanding (MoU) was signed between Medgrid and Desertec Industry Initiative (Dii) to study, design and promote an interconnected electrical grid with Desertec & Medgrid projects. The medgrid together with Desertec would serve as the backbone of the European super grid and the benefits of investing in HVDC technology are being assessed to reach the final goal – the supersmart grid.

Evaluations

A report by Pöyry stated that a super grid would only partially reduce the problems from intermittent renewable energy production. While it found that spreading renewables across Europe produced a smoothing effect, large scale weather patterns would impact many European countries at similar times. This still results in large highs and lows of energy output.  However this report does not consider the super grid covering the much larger area as the Czisch study, which would further smooth energy output to some extent.

See also 
 Intermittent energy source
 Relative cost of electricity generated by different sources
 SuperSmart Grid
 Synchronous grid of Continental Europe
 Wide area synchronous grid

References

External links
 European Commission Third Legislative Package
 MoU of the North Sea Countries Offshore Grid Initiative
 Supergrid Phase I proposal
 English translation (750 pages) of Gregor Czisch's supergrid thesis, by HE Translations
 Demand Side Management for the European Supergrid

Proposed electric power transmission systems
Electric power in the European Union
Electric power transmission systems in Europe
Euromediterranean Partnership
Proposed electric power infrastructure in Europe

de:Europäisches Supergrid